KOZE (950 kHz) is a commercial AM radio station broadcasting a talk radio format. Licensed to Lewiston, Idaho, United States, the station is currently owned by Lee and Angie McVey's McVey Entertainment Group, LLC. 

By day, KOZE is powered at 5,000 watts.  But at night, to reduce interference to other stations on 950 AM, KOZE reduces power to 1,000 watts.  It uses a directional antenna with a three-tower array.

Programming
Most of KOZE's weekday programming is from nationally syndicated conservative talk shows.  They include Doug Stephan, Glenn Beck, Dennis Prager, Michael Medved, Dave Ramsey, Jim Bohannon and "Coast to Coast AM with George Noory."  

Weekends feature shows on money, health, pets, guns, cars, technology and real estate.  Weekend hosts include Kim Komando, Dr. Ronald Hoffman, Ron Aninian, Warren Eckstein and "Somewhere in Time with Art Bell."  Most hours begin with an update from ABC News Radio.

History
On , the station signed on the air.  The original call sign was KLER.  Four years later, it switched to the current KOZE call letters.  In 1961, an FM station was added, 96.5 KOZE-FM.

During the 1960s and 70s, KOZE was a popular Top 40 radio station.  It had been affiliated with the ABC Contemporary Radio Network.

References

External links

FCC History cards for KOZE

OZE (AM)
News and talk radio stations in the United States
Radio stations established in 1953
1953 establishments in Idaho